Mary Clare Judith Phyllis Jose Quiambao (born Mary Clare Judith Phyllis Atienza Jose; August 26, 1988), better known as Niña Jose, is a Filipina actress and politician serving as the mayor of Bayambang since 2022. She was a competitor in Pinoy Big Brother: Teen Edition 1 in 2006. She is currently a contract actress for the ABS-CBN television network.
She has appeared on the cover of FHM Philippines magazine.

Life and career

Personal life
Jose is the older of two children born to Philip and Clare, who later separated. From kindergarten through high school, she studied at Assumption College San Lorenzo, an all-girls Catholic school.

Showbiz career
In 2006, Jose was one of the housemates in the first season of Pinoy Big Brother: Teen Edition. She was one of the most popular housemates in that reality show. Afterwards, she appeared in numerous television shows including Sa Adventures of Pedro Penduko, My Girl, Your Song: My Only Hope, Valiente, Kidlat and many others. She also appeared in movies like Shake, Rattle and Roll, Love Is Blind and Mano Po 6.

Political career
In 2016, Jose met billionaire businessman Cezar Quiambao. Quiambao, who was 40 years older than her, is also the President and Chief Executive Officer of StradCom, known as the IT service provider of Land Transportation Office The couple met while Quiambao is campaigning for mayor of Bayambang, Pangasinan. The two married three times, first in the United States, second in a civil ceremony and third in a Church wedding at the Saint Vincent Ferrer Parish in Bayambang. The couple had a son named Antonio. In 2020, Jose suffered a miscarriage while performing a suob or steam bath. Her second child is named Maria Christiano Isabelo is currently buried at the Saint Vincent Ferrer Prayer Park in Bayambang. Months after, she along with her husband, family and close friends were contracted with COVID-19.

During the term of her husband as Mayor of Bayambang, Pangasinan, Jose served as president of the Local Council of Women of Bayambang. One of her projects is the Abong na Aro or House of Love that provides shelter of women and children who were victim of physical and sexual abuse. She is also the president of the Agricultural Infrastructure and Leasing Corporation, a private entity of the Quiambao family that provided help for farmers in the municipality. Jose also served as president of Kasama kita sa Barangay Foundation, Incorporated. She was also behind the Saint Vincent Ferrer Statue in Barangay Bani, that was recognized by the Guinness Book of World Records as the world's tallest bamboo sculpture.

In the 2022 elections, although her husband is eligible for a third and final term, she decided to run for mayor. She was elected mayor of Bayambang.  Her running mate, Ian Camille Sabangan, who substituted her husband, incumbent vice mayor Raul Sabangan, was also elected. This was the first time that two women were elected in the two top positions in the municipality.

Filmography

Television

Film

Modeling career and endorsements

TV commercials

Endorsements

Notes

References

External links
Actress' website
"Niña Jose", IMDB

1988 births
Living people
Actresses from Manila
Pinoy Big Brother contestants
Star Magic
Filipina gravure idols